The Uruguayan Youth Standing or Uruguayan Youth at Attention was a right to far-right student organization in Uruguay during the 1970s.

This relatively short-lived organization (it was dissolved in 1974) had a Patriotic and anti-Communist orientation and was opposed to the insurgency of the Tupamaros and other far-left organizations. It experienced rapid growth, but its armed struggle efforts were relatively less successful. A factional undercurrent of the group desired a national revolution along the lines of Falangism.

The main colours of their flag represent the two traditional major Uruguayan political parties: the National Party (white) and the Colorado Party (red). Presidents Jorge Pacheco Areco and Juan María Bordaberry both spoke positively of the group.

Bibliography

References

External links 

Far-right politics in Uruguay
Anti-communism in Uruguay
Student organizations in Uruguay
Youth organizations based in Uruguay
Student organizations established in 1970
1970 establishments in Uruguay
Organizations disestablished in 1974
1974 disestablishments in Uruguay